Micropterix klimeschi is a species of moth belonging to the family Micropterigidae. It was described by Heath in 1973. It is known from Rhodes and Turkey.

The wingspan is 6.3-8.8 mm.

It was reported on Pistacia lentiscus.

Subspecies
Micropterix klimeschi rhodiensis Kurz, M. A., M. E. Kurz & Zeller, 1993 (Rhodos)
Micropterix klimeschi klimeschi Heath, 1973 (Dedegöl Dag in Turkey)

References

Micropterigidae
Moths described in 1973
Moths of Europe
Moths of Asia